Kaalaiyum Neeye Maalaiyum Neeye is a 1988 Indian Tamil-language action film, directed by R. Sundarrajan and produced by R. Ponraj and P K. Unni. The film stars Vijayakanth, Prabhu, Raadhika and Lakshmi. It was released on 15 January 1988.

Plot

Cast 

Vijayakanth
Prabhu
Pandiyan
Lakshmi
Raadhika
Rekha
Senthil
C. R. Parthiban (Judge)
Vijayan
K. Natarajan
Vijay Krishnaraj
V. Gopalakrishnan
Vennira Aadai Moorthy
Ramnath
Ram Mohan
Rajasekar
Gopi

Production 
Kaalaiyum Neeye Maalaiyum Neeye was named after a song from Thennilavu (1961), composed by A. M. Rajah. During the film, Vijayakanth's face was cut by a metal casket due to another actor firing at the wrong time, with Vijayakanth staying in a dark room for three months afterwards.

Soundtrack 
The soundtrack was composed by Devendran with lyrics by Vaali, Gangai Amaran and Rajasundar.

Release and reception 
Kaalaiyum Neeye Maalaiyum Neeye was released on 15 January 1988. The following week, N. Krishnaswamy of The Indian Express wrote, "In the melange of incidents and medley of characters, artistes tend to get lost". He also did not like how both the lead actresses, Raadhika and Lakshmi, were underutilised. Jayamanmadhan of Kalki criticised the film for having a poetic title and contrastingly violent content.

References

External links 
 

1980s Tamil-language films
1988 action films
1988 films
Films directed by R. Sundarrajan
Films scored by Devendran
Indian action films